The banjeaurine,  also spelled banjourine or banjorine, was a variant of the banjo, designed to play lead instrument in  banjo orchestras from the 1890s to the 1930s.

They have shorter necks than traditional 5-string banjos, and are tuned a fourth higher, in C. There were normally two of these instruments in a banjo orchestra.

A banjo manufacturer named Samuel Swaim Stewart, also called S.S., invented the banjeaurine. From Philadelphia, Stewart advertised the banjeaurine and this instrument became a critical part of banjo orchestras. The banjeaurine first hit the music scene in 1885, played before the public by William A Huntley. In banjo orchestras, the banjeaurine was responsible for the majority of the solos in musical pieces. The banjeaurine has a short neck with a scale between 19" and 20", a fretboard extension that is cantilevered over the head, and either 17 or 19 frets. It is a higher pitched version of the conventional 5 string banjo. Most banjeaurines, especially early ones, have 12"- to 12-1/2"-diameter rims. Later models may have 11" rims, a size that became a standard banjo rim size during the late 1920s. The body has a top made out of skin, real or synthetic, and usually an open back without a resonator. The banjeaurine has five strings. One is shorter than the others, and is called the fifth string, or thumb string. The concept of the banjeaurine is similar to that of other banjo-family instruments.

Banjeaurines were most notably constructed by S.S. Stewart, but were offered by most major banjo manufacturers, including Washburn, Fairbanks, Fairbanks & Cole, Cole, Vega,  Weyman, Schall, Thompson & Odell, Kraske, Lyon & Healy, and many others.

References

External links
https://web.archive.org/web/20100306010853/http://www.banjoorchestra.org/history.html
https://web.archive.org/web/20090207003442/http://www.classicbanjo.com/instruments.php
https://web.archive.org/web/20100926133227/http://irish-banjo.com/instruments/five-string-banjo/banjeaurine/index.html

Banjo family instruments